The United States competed at the 2018 Winter Paralympics in Pyeongchang, South Korea from 9 to 18 March 2018.

With 13 gold, 15 silver and 8 bronze medals, the US athletes had their best performance in 16 years and were the most successful national selection for the first time since 1994, ahead of the neutral athletes from Russia and the Canadian team. The most successful athlete within the US team was Oksana Masters with two gold, two silver and one bronze medal. Kendall Gretsch and Brenna Huckaby also each won two gold medals. With one gold, four silver and one bronze, David Cnossen was the most successful male US participant of the 2018 Paralympics.

Medalists

| width="78%" align="left" valign="top" |

| width="22%" align="left" valign="top" |

Alpine skiing

Men
Sitting

Standing

Visually Impaired

Women
Sitting

Standing

Visually Impaired

Biathlon

Men
Sitting

Standing

Women
Sitting

Cross-country skiing

Men
Sitting

Visually Impaired

Women
Sitting

Standing

Visually Impaired

Snowboarding

The World Para Snowboard World Cup Finals in Big White, British Columbia took place in February 2018.  The event was the final one used to decide who would represent the United States at the 2018 Games. To be eligible to represent the United States at the Paralympic Games, American snowboarders had to get season race points in at least one race in the 2017-18 season. The deadline to get the points was 19 February 2018.  On February 20, the names of the U.S. Paralympic Snowboarding Team were made public.

Snowboard cross
Men

Women

Para ice hockey

The USA could play at the 2018 Paralympics after it won competitions in 2017, before the Games started.

The United States national sledge hockey team played in several tournaments and friendly games to get ready for the Winter Paralympics. The team played in the December 2017 World Sled Hockey Challenge in Charlottetown, Prince Edward Island. They played in the Para Ice Hockey International Tournament in Turin, Italy in January 2018. They also played in the 2018 Border Series in Buffalo, New York and Pt. Colborne, Ontario in February 2018.
Roster
Head coach: Guy Gosselin
Assistant coach: David Hoff, 
General Manager: Dan Brennan,
Team doctor: Michael Uihein
Team physiotherapist: Mike Cortese
Team equipment manager: Scott Aldrich
Team media officer: Scott Aldrich

Summary
Key:
* OT – Overtime
* GWS – Match decided by penalty-shootout

Preliminary round

Semi-finals

Gold medal game

Wheelchair curling

Summary

The national team first decided who might be part of the national team in September 2017 in Incheon, South Korea. The second time when the national team said some people may not be able to go was at an event in Green Bay, Wisconsin in October 2017. The final choice of who would be on Team USA for the 2018 Games was made at USA National Team event in Wausau, Wisconsin in early November 2017.

Before the Games started, American wheelchair curlers had a few important dates in preparation for the Games. These included the U.S. Open in Utica, New York  in December 2017, the Kisakallio Cup in Kisakallio, Finland in January 2018, and Sochi Open in January 2018.

Round robin standings

Results
United States has a bye in draws 2, 4, 6, 9, 14 and 16.

Draw 1
Saturday, 10 March, 14:35

Draw 3
Sunday, 11 March, 9:35

Draw 5
Sunday, 11 March, 19:35

Draw 7
Monday, 12 March, 14:35

Draw 8
Monday, 12 March, 19:35

Draw 10
Tuesday, 13 March, 14:35

Draw 11
Tuesday, 13 March, 19:35

Draw 12
Wednesday, 14 March, 9:35

Draw 13
Wednesday, 14 March, 14:35

Draw 15
Thursday, 15 March, 9:35

Draw 17
Thursday, 15 March, 19:35

See also
United States at the 2018 Winter Olympics

References

Nations at the 2018 Winter Paralympics
2018
Paralympics